Elections to the newly created Cheshire East Council took place on 1 May 2008. Elections occurred in all 27 wards, with each ward returning three councillors to the council. The wards were identical to the former Cheshire County Council wards.

From May 2008 until April 2009, the elected members formed a "shadow" council, which made preparations for the changeover from the county and borough structure to the new unitary authority structure. Thereafter, the members serve for two years from May 2009 with the next elections are scheduled for May 2011.

Results

The Conservative Party took overall control of the council with a majority of 37 councillors.

After the election, the composition of the council was:

Conservative 59
Liberal Democrat 12
Labour 6
Middlewich First 3
Nantwich Independent 1

N.B. The change in voting percentages refers to the change since the 2005 Cheshire Council election, the last time that voting took place in the same wards.

Comparison with projections based on the 2005 results

At the 2005 Cheshire County Council election, there were 15 Conservative controlled wards, 6 Labour controlled wards, 5 Liberal Democrat controlled wards and 1 ward controlled by an independent. Based on the 2005 results, the Cheshire East Council election would have resulted in 45 Conservative councillors, 18 Labour councillors, 15 Liberal Democrat councillors and 3 independents; the projected results would have given the Conservatives overall control of the council, with a majority of 9 councillors.

Results by ward

Alderley ward

Current county councillor: Mark Asquith (Conservative)

Alsager ward

Current county councillor: Rod Fletcher (Liberal Democrat)

Bollington and Disley ward

Current county councillor: Sylvia Roberts (Liberal Democrat)

Broken Cross ward

Current county councillor: David Freear (Conservative)

Bucklow ward

Current county councillor: Steve Wilkinson (Conservative)

Cholmondeley ward

Current county councillor: Allan Richardson (Conservative)

Congleton Rural ward

Current county councillor: Ken Oliver (Conservative)

Congleton Town East ward

Current county councillor: Peter Mason (Conservative)

Congleton Town West ward

Current county councillor: Bill Wolstencroft (Conservative)

Crewe East ward

Current county councillor: Gordon Fyffe (Labour)

Crewe North ward

Current county councillor: Peter Nurse (Labour)

Crewe South ward

Current county councillor: Dorothy Flude (Labour)

Crewe West ward

Current county councillor: David Newton (Labour)

Doddington ward

Current county councillor: David Brickhill (Conservative)

Knutsford ward

Current county councillor: Bert Grange (Conservative)

Macclesfield Forest ward

Current county councillor: Barrie Hardern (Conservative)

Macclesfield Town ward

Current county councillor: Nell Carter (Labour)

Macclesfield West ward

Current county councillor: Ken Edwards (Labour)

Middlewich ward

Current county councillor: Mark Dickson (Conservative)

Nantwich ward

Current county councillor: Arthur Moran (Independent)

Poynton ward

Current county councillor: Chris Claxton (Conservative)

Prestbury and Tytherington ward

Current county councillor: Paul Findlow (Conservative)

Rope ward

Current county councillor: Margaret Simon (Conservative)

Sandbach ward

Current county councillor: Neville Price (Independent) (elected as a Conservative in 2005)

Sandbach East and Rode ward

Current county councillor: Roy Giltrap (Liberal Democrat)

Wilmslow North ward

Current county councillor: Adrian Bradley (Liberal Democrat)

Wilmslow South ward

Current county councillor: Pat Fearnley (Liberal Democrat)

See also
2008 Cheshire West and Chester Council election

References

2008 English local elections
2008
2000s in Cheshire